The 2009 Badminton Asia Championships is the 28th tournament of the Badminton Asia Championships. It was held in Suwon, South Korea from 7 to 12 April 2009.

Venue 
 Suwon Indoor Stadium.

Medalists

Medal count

Final results

Men's singles

Women's singles

Men's doubles

Women's doubles

Mixed doubles

References

External links 
 Badminton Asia Championships 2009 at tournamentsoftware.com

Badminton Asia Championships
Asian Badminton Championships
Badminton tournaments in South Korea
Sports competitions in Suwon